Grandy is a surname. Notable people with the surname include:

Charlie Grandy (born 1974), American stand-up comedian, television writer and producer
Fred Grandy (born 1948), American actor and politician
John Grandy (1913–2004), Royal Air Force officer
Moses Grandy (c.  1786 – ?), American writer and abolitionist
Robert Grandy, Canadian businessman